The Stuttgarter Fernmeldeturm (Stuttgart Telecommunication Tower) is a reinforced concrete tower for radio relay, FM, and TV transmitting services at Stuttgart-Frauenkopf in Germany. Unlike the Stuttgart TV tower, it is not accessible to the public. It belongs to Deutsche Telekom and is 192.4 metres high. The tower has an operations room with a diameter of 40.6 meters at a height of 33.78 metres.

See also
List of towers
List of masts

References
 Schlaich, Jörg, Schüller, Matthias, Ingenieurbauführer Baden-Württemberg, page 489–490. # concrete and reinforced concrete construction, number 4/1971
 
 Picture on Google-Maps

Buildings and structures in Stuttgart